The chapters of the Japanese manga series Psyren are written and illustrated by Toshiaki Iwashiro. It is published in Japan by Shueisha, and has been serialized in the shōnen manga magazine Weekly Shōnen Jump since the 3 December 2007 issue. Publication is completed, with serial chapters having been collected into six tankōbon volumes as of June 2009. The series is about the adventures of a high school student named Ageha Yoshina, who learns to develop his psychic abilities after being transported to a world named Psyren.  On October 4, 2011, the first volume of Psyren was released in the US by Viz Media's Shonen Jump.


Volume list

References 

Psyren